The participation of transgender people in competitive sports, a traditionally sex-segregated institution, is a controversial issue, particularly the inclusion of transgender women and girls in women's sports.

Opponents argue that transgender women have an unfair advantage over, and may endanger, cisgender women in competitive sports due to sex differences in human physiology, and that these differences are not sufficiently reversed by transgender hormone therapies. Supporters of transgender athletes argue that medically prescribed puberty blockers and estrogen suppress testosterone levels and reduce the muscle mass of transgender women, reducing possible competitive advantages. Supporters also argue that sport, particularly youth sports, is also about belonging, well-being, and socialization of young people. The American Medical Association states that legislation barring trans women from women's sports harms the mental health of transgender people.

The controversy has caused debates regarding sex verification in sports. Since the mid-twentieth century, sports institutions have responded to the participation of transgender women, and women suspected to be transgender, male, or intersex, by adding eligibility requirements to women's sports variously determined by physical examination, sex chromosomes, and sex hormones. Proponents of such regulations regard them as necessary to ensure fair competition and women's safety. Opponents have criticized such regulations as discriminatory against transgender and intersex women, disproportionately affecting women of color, and as causing violations of medical ethics.

Since the late 2010s and early 2020s, some U.S. states have passed legislation restricting the participation of transgender youth in high school sports, or of trans women and girls in women's sports.

History of transgender athletes in competition
Historically, sport has been seen as a male domain. The masculine perception of sport was first moderated with the rise of women's sports and further challenged with the gradual acceptance of gay sportsmen. A third departure from tradition occurred with the emergence of trans athletes, many of whom challenge the culturally accepted binary gender norms of male and female.

Renée Richards

One of the earliest high-profile transgender athlete was tennis player Renée Richards. Already a promising tennis player in the men's circuit, Richards underwent gender reassignment therapy in 1975 and started playing in women's tournaments a year later. Her discovery and the resulting media frenzy sparked protests. After she accepted an invitation to a warm-up tournament for the US Open, the Women's Tennis Association (WTA) and the United States Tennis Association (USTA) withdrew their support and 25 of the 32 women pulled out of the tournament.

As a result the USTA and WTA introduced the Barr body test, which identifies a person's sex chromosomes. Richards refused to take the test and was banned from the US Open. She filed a lawsuit in 1977 claiming that her civil rights were violated and that the policy was unfair. The New York Supreme Court ruled in her favor, saying that the Barr body test as the sole determinant of sex was "grossly unfair" and ruled Richards legally female. She then competed in the 1977 US Open at the age of 43, reaching the doubles final; she retired four years later. At the time, the ruling in Richards's case did not lead to major changes outside of tennis.

Olympics

In 2003, a committee convened by the International Olympic Committee (IOC) Medical Commission drew up new guidelines for participation of athletes who had undergone gender reassignment. The report listed three conditions for participation. First, athletes must have undergone sex reassignment surgery, including changes in the external genitalia and gonadectomy. Second, athletes must show legal recognition of their gender. Third, athletes must have undergone hormone therapy for an appropriate time before participation, with two years being the suggested time.

It was not until 2004 that the IOC allowed transgender athletes to participate in the Olympic Games.

In 2015, the IOC modified these guidelines in recognition that legal recognition of gender could be difficult in countries where gender transition is not legal, and that requiring surgery in otherwise healthy individuals "may be inconsistent with developing legislation and notions of human rights". The new guidelines require only that trans woman athletes declare their gender and not change that assertion for four years, as well as demonstrate a testosterone level of less than 10 nanomoles per liter for at least one year prior to competition and throughout the period of eligibility. Athletes who transitioned from female to male were allowed to compete without restriction. These guidelines were in effect for the 2016 Rio Olympics, although no openly transgender athletes competed.

In 2021, the IOC approved Laurel Hubbard, a trans woman, to compete in the 2020 Summer Olympics in weightlifting. Hubbard became the first out trans woman to compete at the Olympics; she did not complete her lifts and won no medals. Katelyn Burns, an MSNBC Opinion Columnist, suggested Hubbard's performance demonstrates that transgender athletes do not always win. Hubbard competed with the support of her fellow Olympian competitors. Australian weightlifter Charisma Amoe-Tarrant said "I have so much respect for her and wish her and the other lifters the best and hope we can all come together and enjoy the Olympics, because this Olympics right now is quite different compared to others. I’ve competed with her previously and always had good chats with her, I just wish her well."

On 21 July 2021, at the same Games, Canadian non-binary soccer player Quinn became the first transgender person to compete at the Olympics, playing for the Canadian women's soccer team. At the 2020 Summer Olympics, they became the first out, transgender Olympian to medal and win a gold medal. Alana Smith, a non-binary skateboarder, represented the United States in the women's skateboarding semifinals of the 2020 Summer Olympics.

In November 2021 the IOC issued a non-legally binding framework that focuses on ten principles of inclusion: "prevention of harm, non-discrimination, fairness, no presumption of advantage, evidence-based approach, primacy of health and bodily autonomy, stakeholder-centered approach, right to privacy and periodic reviews". The new guidelines have been described as loosening rules that impede transgender and intersex athlete's participation in Olympic sports, with enforcement of sport-specific rules governing inclusion.

On February 18, 2022, Timothy LeDuc became the first openly non-binary athlete to compete in a Winter Olympics in Beijing. They competed in pairs figure skating alongside their skating partner Ashley Cain-Gribble for Team USA.

World Athletics
In October 2019, World Athletics changed the testosterone limit for transgender competitors, setting it at 5 nmol/L, from the previous 10 nmol/L, in order to bring it in line with the DSD (intersex) regulations. According to regulations from October 2019, in order for a trans woman to compete in the women's category: "3.2.1 she must provide a written and signed declaration, in a form satisfactory to the Medical Manager, that her gender identity is female; 3.2.2 she must demonstrate to the satisfaction of the Expert Panel (on the balance of probabilities), in accordance with clause 4, that the concentration of testosterone in her serum has been less than 5 nmol/L continuously for a period of at least 12 months; and 3.2.3 she must keep her serum testosterone concentration below 5 nmol/L for so long as she wishes to maintain her eligibility to compete in the female category of competition." World Athletics also has rules for intersex/differences of sex development (DSD) athletes. DSD athletes will be subjected to specific rules if they have XY male chromosomes, testes rather than ovaries, have circulating testosterone within the typical male range (7.7 to 29.4 nmol/L), and are androgen-sensitive so that their body makes use of that testosterone. World Athletics requires that any such athlete must reduce their blood testosterone level to 5 nmol/L or lower for a six-month period before becoming eligible for track running events from 400 metres to the mile run in international competition, though World Athletics publicly remains open to extending this to other events based on new scientific study. World Athletics created these rules as a way to ensure fair competition in the women's category.

Others 
In 1996, the Iron Ladies, a men's volleyball team made up of gay men and transgender women from Thailand, won the national championship. The Iron Ladies were not allowed to join Thailand's national volleyball team because of the way they dressed.

The first out transgender person to make a US national team was Chris Mosier, who in 2016 qualified for Team USA in duathlon. Mosier is considered the catalyst for the change in the IOC policy on transgender athletes in 2015, when he challenged the policy after initially being banned from the world championship race. Mosier also became the first known transgender athlete to compete in the Olympic Trials in the gender with which they identify, and the first trans man to make a men's Olympic Trials, when he competed in January 2020 in the US Olympic Team Trials in the 50k Racewalking event.

In 2017, Mack Beggs, a teenager from Texas, was required to wrestle against girls throughout the season of his transition from female to male up through the state championship, despite wanting to wrestle against boys. This was due to state sport regulations requiring athletes to compete alongside athletes of their assigned sex. Some opponents say the testosterone prescribed as part of his transition gives him an unfair advantage and made it unsafe for the other wrestlers. (He finished the regular season at 52–0 and won the state championship.)

In October 2018, Veronica Ivy (then known as Rachel McKinnon) won a gold medal at the cycling Masters World Track Championship in Los Angeles.

Since 2021, media has widely covered University of Pennsylvania student Lia Thomas, who swam for the men's team in 2018–2019, and for the women's team in 2021. The Washington Post wrote that Thomas was "shattering records". In December 2021, USA Swimming official Cynthia Millen resigned in protest, because of her belief that Thomas has an unfair advantage over her competitors. In February 2022, CNN called Thomas "the face of the debate on transgender women in sports". In March 2022, she became the first openly transgender athlete to win an NCAA Division I national championship in any sport after winning the women's 500-yard freestyle event. 
Thomas lost muscle mass and strength through testosterone suppression and hormone replacement therapy. Her time for the 500 freestyle is over 15 seconds slower than her personal bests before medically transitioning. Thomas's winning time of 4:33.24 was 9.18 seconds short of Katie Ledecky’s NCAA record of 4:24.06. In other races, Thomas has been beaten by multiple cisgender women as well as by Iszac Henig, a transgender man not on hormones. According to Swimming World, by the conclusion of Thomas's swimming career at UPenn in 2022, her rank had moved from 65th on the men's team to 1st on the women's team in the 500-yard freestyle, and 554th on the men's team to 5th on the women's team in the 200-yard freestyle.

In June 2022, the International Swimming Federation (FINA), an organization that administers international aquatic sports competitions, voted to bar all transgender athletes from competing in professional women's swimming, with the exception of athletes who "can establish to FINA's comfortable satisfaction that they have not experienced any part of male puberty beyond Tanner Stage 2 (of puberty) or before age 12, whichever is later". FINA also announced the creation of an "open" category for transgender swimmers to compete in.

World Rugby, the sport's governing body, released the "World Rugby Transgender Guideline" in 2020. The guideline is based on player safety and performance advantage. National Rugby governing bodies are encouraged to use the guideline with flexibility to set domestic rules. The Guideline operates as a policy in all World Rugby Tournaments.

To play women's rugby, transgender women must provide medical documentation confirming they have not experienced and are suppressing a testosterone-driven puberty. Transgender men, regardless of whether they transitioned pre- or post-puberty, may play men's rugby if they provide confirmation they have the physical ability to ensure they are not putting themselves at unacceptable risk. Transgender men who have begun a sex reassignment process that includes supplementing with testosterone may not play women's rugby.

In an exclusive interview with The Telegraph, World Boxing Council President Mauricio Sulaiman said that the WBC would ban trans fighters from competing against cis fighters, and would instead introduce a separate trans category of competition wherein athletes would be divided by their gender assigned at birth. Sulaiman called for current fighters who may be trans to come forward and register accordingly.

Testing

Sports organizations have sought a test for sex verification to ensure fairness across all sports. This began in the 1940s with "femininity certificates" provided by a physician. In the 1960s, visual genital inspections were used to confirm gender, followed by chromosomal analysis to detect the presence of the SRY and DYZ1 genes, normally found on the Y chromosome. These tests were all designed to ensure that athletes were only allowed to compete as their sex, but mostly resulted in the exclusion of intersex athletes. Some LGBTQ advocates have referred to sex verification policies as "genital inspection" and "gender policing" of female athletes.

The first mandatory sex test issued by the International Association of Athletics Federations (IAAF), the world's track and field governing body, for woman athletes was in July 1950 in the month before the European Championships in Belgium. All athletes were tested in their own countries. Sex testing at the actual games began with the 1966 European Athletics Championships’ response to suspicion that several of the best women athletes from the Soviet Union and Eastern Europe were actually men. At the Olympics, testing was introduced in 1968. In some cases, these policies have led to athletes undergoing unnecessary surgery such as female genital mutilation and sterilization. Subsequent reports have shown that the tests could cause psychological harm. Sex verification—identifying athletes whose hormone levels are abnormal compared to others of their purported sex — can cause sex identity crises, elicit demeaning reactions (publicly and privately), isolate athletes socially, and lead to depression and sometimes suicide.

More recently, testosterone levels have become the focus and, at the same time, new guidelines have been sought that would allow successfully-transitioned athletes to compete. Since the proposition in 2003 to use testosterone levels, reputable organizations such as the IOC have adopted strict policies that employ testosterone as a metric to allow successfully transitioned female athletes to compete. More recent guidelines have focused entirely on testosterone levels, such as the IOC's current guidelines, originally set in November 2015, which set limits on transgender athletes' testosterone levels for them to be permitted in women's competition categories. Controversy surrounding the 2020 Tokyo Olympics also centered around testosterone levels, specifically over whether the IOC's guidelines should be amended to set stricter testosterone limits, although this proposed change has been strongly debated. The testing of testosterone alone as a marker for athleticism has been debated.

The increased visibility of trans women in professional sports has led to debates on the IOC policies. Many scientists criticize the policies because of published papers showing that people who went through male puberty retain significant advantages even after a year of testosterone suppression. In July 2021, the IOC's medical and science director, Richard Budgett, stated that the 2015 guidelines were outdated. In 2022, new guidelines were released. According to reporting by Sports Illustrated, the new framework "places the responsibility of establishing guidelines for trans inclusion on each individual sport. It also concludes that sporting bodies should not assume that transgender women have an inherent advantage over cisgender women, nor should transgender women have to reduce their testosterone levels to compete." The framework has been criticized by some medical experts who work for sports federations as ignoring the science on sex, gender, and performance and leading to unfair competition. They suggested that rules based on testosterone could vary based on sport and called on the IOC to set standards for sports to follow.

Testosterone, athletic ability and injury risks
Biological sex differences in humans impact performance in sports. Debate over whether and how transgender women should compete in female sports often has to do with whether they have an unfair advantage over cisgender women due to higher testosterone levels and skeletal, muscle and fat distribution differences. Testosterone regulates many different functions in the body, including the maintenance of bone and muscle mass.

A 2021 literature review concluded that for trans women, even with testosterone suppression, "the data show that strength, lean body mass, muscle size and bone density are only trivially affected. The reductions observed in muscle mass, size, and strength are very small compared to the baseline differences between males and females in these variables, and thus, there are major performance and safety implications in sports where these attributes are competitively significant." After 24 months of testosterone suppression, bone mass is generally preserved. The review states that no study has reported muscle loss greater than 12% with testosterone suppression even after three years of hormone therapy. It found that trans women are in the top 10% of females regarding lean body mass and possess a grip 25% stronger than most females. They suggest that instead of universal guidelines, each individual sport federation decide how to "balance between inclusion, safety and fairness" due to differences between sports.

A 2021 systematic review found that significant decreases in measures of strength, lean body mass and muscle area were observed after 12 months of hormone therapy, while the values remained above those observed in cisgender women, even after 36 months, suggesting that trans women "may retain strength advantages over cisgender women." Effects of longer duration therapy were unclear due to scarcity of data.

A 2017 systematic review of literature relating to sport participation and competitive sports policies reported that there is no direct or comprehensive evidence of transgender women having an athletic advantage over their cisgender counterparts at any stage of transition (e.g. cross-sex hormones or sex reassignment surgery), due to the lack of quantitative research on the subject; this made it "difficult to draw any definite conclusions". Only one of the papers in the systematic review took any physical attributes into account. A 2018 extended essay analyzed the current IOC rule set in 2015 (testosterone below 10 nmol/L for trans women) and found that "the advantage to transwomen afforded by the IOC guidelines is an intolerable unfairness", while they propose to abandon male/female categories in favor of a more nuanced division.

A 38-page draft document from World Rugby's transgender working group in 2020 acknowledged that rugby players who are cisgender women, when tackled by a player who has gone through male puberty, are at a significantly greater risk of injury. The working group calculated that increased injury risk for typical players with female characteristics when tackled by a typical player with male characteristics was between 20 and 30%, and potentially reaching "levels twice as large" in extreme cases where the players are unusually small and large, respectively. Consequently, the document proposes that in the absence of persuasive evidence to the contrary, International Olympic Committee (IOC) guidelines regarding a minimum 12-month lowering of testosterone are "not fit for purpose" in the context of rugby. This move was criticized because there were "no examples of transgender women causing serious injuries to cisgender women".

National approaches

Canada 
Canadian sport organizations must comply with the Canadian Human Rights Act, which includes gender identity and expression as a prohibited ground for discrimination.

The Canadian Centre for Ethics in Sport (CCES) is recognized as the Canadian policy leader for transgender people's participation in sport at the national level. In 2016, CCES issued guidance which sets out that, until international rules apply, athletes should be able to participate in the gender with which they identify without being subject to any requirements that are different from those of cisgender athletes, unless there is a specific and legitimate reason for the requirement.

As an athlete moves into competitions governed by international rules, the athlete will decide whether to compete under the applicable international rules. Canadian sport organizations should not consider the athlete's ultimate decision when selecting athletes to represent Canada in international competitions.

Some sports organizations such as viaSport, Ringette Canada, and Gymnastics Canada have policies which align to the CCES guidance. Rugby Canada responded to World Rugby's guidance by releasing a statement recommitting to the "Rugby Canada TransInclusion Policy", which is aligned to the CCES guidance. Others, like Swimming Canada, have not fully aligned to the CCES guidance. For example, to swim in national selection events, transgender swimmers must provide written proof that they are eligible for international competition from the international swimming federation to Swimming Canada.

Public opinion polling indicates many Canadians believe it is unfair for transgender women to compete in women's sports. However, Canadian Women and Sport, a leading voice for the advancement of women and girls in sport, does not believe the inclusion of transgender women and girls threatens the advancement of women in sport.

United Kingdom 
UK Sport published guidance for transgender inclusion in September 2021, which concludes that there is not a competitive model where the inclusion of transgender people allows safety and fairness to coexist. The Sports Council will work with the National Governing Body (NGB) and Scottish Governing Body (SGB) to find the optimal outcome under a framework that defines the priorities of the sport bodies. NGB and SGB will prioritize transgender inclusion, fairness, and safety equally to develop a decision-making model for their sports.

UK Sport believes there is not yet enough evidence to prove that the suppression of testosterone for 12 months achieves parity of strength, stamina and physique for transgender women compared with females. UK Sport believes there is enough evidence to show testosterone supplementation in transgender men seems to create parity within the strength and speed of males. They believe there is evidence to show bone conformation remains and should be considered in sports where safety is relevant.

In September 2021, the UK Sports Council Equality Group issued new guidance saying that in their view, trans inclusion and "competitive fairness" cannot coexist in sports. The SCEG based its guidance on 300 interviews regarding personal opinions on the matter, conducted across 54 sports and 175 organisations, with only 20 of those interviewed being trans people.

In June 2022, conservative UK culture secretary Nadine Dorries met with the heads of UK sporting bodies and told them that "elite and competitive women's sport must be reserved for people born of the female sex".

In July 2022, the British Triathlon issued a blanket policy banning any athletes not assigned female at birth above the age of 12 from competing, instead requiring them to compete in a newly announced "open" category. This was a reversal of an earlier 2018 policy which allowed for trans inclusion once certain hormonal prerequisites had been met.

British Triathlon Chief Executive Andy Salmon was reported as stating that he wasn't "aware" of any elite-level trans athletes competing in triathlons in Britain, but didn't want the governing body to wait for "that to be a problem" before it "tried to fix it".

Later that same month, both the Rugby Football League and the Rugby Football Union implemented similar bans. Both organisations described this as "a precautionary approach".

New Zealand 
Sport New Zealand and High Performance Sport New Zealand, crown agencies that lead active recreation and sport throughout New Zealand, are currently developing guiding principles for the inclusion of transgender participants in community sport. This publication will serve to guide sport and recreation organizations at a national level toward developing a policy within their respective sport codes covering transgender inclusion in community sport, but not elite sport. 

New Zealand Rugby is currently reviewing its own transgender guidelines for grassroots community rugby with Sport New Zealand in consultation with stakeholders. Their stance on elite sport remains consistent with World Rugby's transgender eligibility and participation policy for professional rugby.

Australia 
In June 2019, Sport Australia and the Australian Human Rights Commission published a report together with the Coalition of Major Professional and Participation Sports (COMPPS). The report is targeted to sporting organizations at all levels from community sport to elite sport in the context of promoting an inclusive environment for transgender and gender diverse people in sport across the country. The COMPPS consists of member organizations in Australia including: Australian Football League, Cricket Australia, Football Federation Australia, National Rugby League, Netball Australia, Rugby Australia and Tennis Australia.

Rugby Australia released guidelines which permit transgender participants to play the game on a case-by-case basis for community rugby competitions at the amateur level, but remain aligned with World Rugby's policy for professional rugby.

In August 2019, Cricket Australia released their guidelines for inclusion. The guidelines serve to promote an inclusive environment for gender diverse participants playing community cricket and allows players to participate in the gender with which they identify rather than their sex, without requiring medical examinations.

In terms of grassroots sport clubs, the Australian not-for-profit sporting inclusion program Pride In Sport maintains a directory of independent LGBTQ sporting clubs in Australia. This listing published an extensive number of sports having at least one club within each of the states and territories of the country.

In secondary education

Australia
In July 2019, Sport Australia published guidelines on making sport more inclusive for transgender and gender-diverse people.

Canada 
Provincial governing bodies for high school sports have independent policies on the participation of transgender or non-binary athletes on sex-segregated teams. Organizations such as the Alberta Schools' Athletic Association, the Manitoba High Schools Athletics Association and BC School Sports each have policies that allow the participation of transgender student-athletes in accordance with their gender identity.

Transgender or non-binary student-athletes looking to compete in a team consistent with their gender identity in British Columbia must submit an application to the BC School Sports Executive Director, and are required to have a written statement from both the student-athlete and the principal of their high school confirming their gender identity.

United States
There are no rules federally to regulate inclusion of transgender children. States vary widely on participation of transgender children in sports and which locker room those students should use. Opponents of including transgender athletes emphasize the argument that there may be an unfair advantage of larger size and strength in trans women, and trans athletes could threaten the safety of cisgender children, both in competition and in the locker room. Advocates in favor of allowing transgender children to participate in sports based on their preferred gender point out the known benefits of participating in sports and the psychological well-being of the transgender children. Many states have tried to mimic the NCAA and IOC rules that rely on testosterone level tests to determine when a trans woman can participate in women's sports competitions. These kinds of rules are more difficult to enforce in secondary education because of the lack of resources to test testosterone levels, and medical professionals are often hesitant to prescribe minors hormones. States have individually come up with rules to regulate trans athlete participation through restricting transgender athletes to teams of their assigned sex at birth, matching NCAA/IOC guidelines, allowing school districts to decide, or allowing complete inclusion.

19 U.S. States have banned transgender people from sports under their gender identity in various capacities. These states include Texas, Arkansas, Florida, Alabama, Oklahoma, Kentucky,  Mississippi, Tennessee, West Virginia, South Carolina, Utah, South Dakota, Montana, Iowa, Arizona, Idaho, Indiana, Louisiana, and Georgia. The US Department of Education has said transgender students are protected under Title IX.

 In Indiana, schools rely on anatomical sex, requiring gender reassignment surgery for trans athletes to participate in the sport of their identified gender.
 Nebraska has formed a Gender Identity Eligibility Committee that decides on a case-by-case basis of how each transgender athlete can participate as their self-identified gender.
 Texas, Alabama, North Carolina, Kentucky, Idaho, and Florida require trans athletes to compete based on their biological sex.
 In Alaska, Connecticut, Georgia, Kansas, Pennsylvania, and Wisconsin, each school district makes their own decision on how to include transgender athletes.
 Maine gives approval for students to choose which team they wish to play on, approving based on safety and fairness.
 New Jersey and New Mexico require that trans athletes provide evidence that they have transitioned or are transitioning.
 Missouri and Ohio require athletes to undergo hormone treatment. Ohio requires that the athlete must have been on the hormones for at least a year prior to competing.
 Oregon allows those who identify as male to participate on male teams, and they are then on excluded from girls' competitions. Those transitioning from male to female must be on hormone treatment for at least a year.
 Iowa bans transgender girls and women from playing female sports. No such stipulation applies to transgender boys and men with regard to male sports.
 Oklahoma requires that any student participating in sports must submit a notarized affidavit of gender assigned at birth, under penalty of perjury.

Hecox v. Little
In March 2020, Idaho Governor Brad Little signed into law the "Fairness in Women's Sports Act", also known as House Bill 500. This legislation, the first of its kind in the United States, prohibits transgender athletes from competing in sports against athletes of the other biological sex. In April 2020, the ACLU and the Legal Voice filed a lawsuit, Hecox v. Little, arguing that this law violates the US Constitution and Title IX. ADF Legal Counsel Christiana Holcomb, representing two female athletes, said: "Both of our clients agree: Putting male athletes up against females is simply not fair because it changes the nature and dynamics of sport for young women ... In one year, 275 high school boys ran faster times than the lifetime best of World Champion sprinter Allyson Felix." On August 17, 2020, the United States District Court for the District of Idaho issued a preliminary injunction against the law pending trial, issuing an opinion that the plaintiffs were "likely to succeed in establishing [that] the Act is unconstitutional as currently written".  the case is before the Ninth Circuit Court of Appeals.

Soule v. Connecticut Association of Schools 

After women's high school competitions were won by transgender student Andraya Yearwood in Connecticut, a lawsuit was filed against the Connecticut Association of Schools-Connecticut Interscholastic Athletic Conference (CIAC) and several school boards in federal court to try to stop the participation of transgender athletes. Christiana Holcomb, ADF Legal Counsel in the case, said that Yearwood and Terry Miller (another transgender student athlete in Connecticut) between them "amassed 15 different state championship titles that were once held by nine different girls across the state." The lawsuit was dismissed in April 2021 by the district court as moot.

In October 2021, women's sports icons Billie Jean King, World Cup Champion and United States women's national soccer team Co-Captain Megan Rapinoe, WNBA stars Brianna Turner, Layshia Clarendon, and over 150 athletes in women's sports spoke out in support of transgender athletes and filed an amicus brief in an appeal of the Soule v. CIAC trial court dismissal, along with the Women's National Basketball Players Association (WNBPA), Athlete Ally, and the Women's Sports Foundation, in support of CIAC and affirming the dismissal.

On December 16, 2022, a three-judge panel of the Second Circuit Appeals Court ruled against the plaintiffs, citing the 2020 decision Bostock v. Clayton County, Georgia, in which the Supreme Court ruled discrimination against transgender employees violated Title VII of the Civil Rights Act of 1964.

Post-secondary education

Canada 
In September 2018, U Sports, the governing body of intercollegiate and varsity athletics in Canada, released a policy addressing eligibility and best practices for the inclusion of transgender student-athletes at their member institutions. Under this new policy, U Sports student-athletes are able to compete according to their gender identity or sex assigned at birth provided they meet requirements of the Canadian Anti-Doping Program. Transgender student-athletes, like other U Sports athletes, are given five years of eligibility to compete and may only represent one gender of sports team per school year.

United Kingdom 
Under the Equality Act 2010, discrimination based on sex or gender reassignment is illegal, but certain sporting activities are exempt if transgender athletes competing would put non-transgender athletes at an unfair disadvantage. It does not apply to those who consider themselves trans or non-binary, but have not undergone gender reassignment officially.

In April 2022, the Prime Minister Boris Johnson said he believed that transgender women should not compete in women's sport.

United States 
In August 2011, the National Collegiate Athletic Association Office of Inclusion published the NCAA Inclusion of Transgender Student-Athletes resource outlining their best practices and policies for the inclusion for transgender student-athletes. This policy permits transgender athletes who are not using hormone therapy to continue to participate on the team that corresponds to their assigned sex at birth. A trans man student-athlete may participate on either a men's or women's team, unless receiving testosterone, in which case he may only compete on a men's team; athletes receiving doses of testosterone as a part of their transition must apply for a medical exemption through the league, as testosterone is considered a banned substance in the NCAA. A trans woman student-athlete is not permitted to compete on a women's team until after one year of testosterone suppression treatment. Ongoing monitoring of treatment and written documentation is required for student-athletes undergoing testosterone suppression.

Australia 
University and Tertiary Sport New Zealand (UTSNZ) has its own inclusion policy covering transgender and gender diverse athletes in sport. The policy allows transgender athletes to compete in the sport category that aligns to their gender identity.Transgender females are permitted to compete in a male UTSNZ competition. If transgender females have undergone testosterone suppression for 12 months, they may also compete in female competition. Similarly, transgender males are eligible to participate in either male or female competition (but not both categories within one season), provided they are not undergoing hormone treatment for gender transition. For transgender males who have taken hormone treatment with testosterone related to gender transition, they may no longer compete in female competition but can still compete in male competition.

Public opinion 
A 2021 Gallup poll showed that 62% of Americans opposed people playing on teams that matched their gender identity rather than their birth sex. However, a 2021 PBS/NPR/Marist poll found 67% of Americans, including 66% of Republicans, oppose legislation that would prohibit transgender student athletes from joining sports teams that match their gender identity.

A March 2022 Harvard CAPS-Harris Poll found that 63% of Americans were against gender-transitioning athletes competing in opposite-sex sporting events, while 37% of Americans were in favour of them competing. 60% of Democrats, 32% of Independents, and 20% of Republicans were in favour of gender-transitioning athletes competing in opposite-sex sporting events, while 80% of Republicans, 68% of Independents, and 40% of Democrats were against them competing.

A May 2022 Washington Post-University of Maryland poll found that 55% of Americans were against allowing transgender women and girls to compete with other women and girls in high school, 58% were against allowing transgender women to compete with other women and girls in college and professional sports, 30% of Americans were in support of transgender women and girls competing with other women and girls in high school, college and professional levels, and 15% had no opinion. The poll also found that 49% of Americans were against allowing transgender girls to compete with other girls in youth sports, 33% were in support of transgender girls competing with other girls in youth sports, and 17% had no opinion.

Notable trans athletes

Trans men 
 Kye Allums, basketball
 Schuyler Bailar, swimming
 Mack Beggs, wrestling
 Harrison Browne, ice hockey
 Balian Buschbaum, pole vault
 Willy De Bruyn, cycling
 Keelin Godsey, hammer throw
 Zdeněk Koubek, track
 Andreas Krieger, shot put
 Patricio Manuel, boxing
 Chris Mosier, triathlon and duathlon
 Quince Mountain, Iditarod

Trans women 
 Tifanny Abreu, volleyball
 Mianne Bagger, golf
 Savannah Burton, dodgeball
 Parinya Charoenphol, Thai boxing
 Roberta Cowell, motor sports
 Michelle Duff, motorcycle road racing
 Michelle Dumaresq, downhill mountain biking
 Fallon Fox, mixed martial arts
 Natalie van Gogh, cycling 
 Laurel Hubbard, weightlifting
 Veronica Ivy, cycling
 Lauren Jeska, fell running
 Janae Kroc, powerlifting
 Bobbi Lancaster, golf
 Charlie Christina Martin, motor sports
 Cate McGregor, cricket
 Hannah Mouncey, handball and Australian football
 Apayauq Reitan, Iditarod
 Renée Richards, tennis
 Jaiyah Saelua, football
 Britney Stinson, baseball and football
 Cece Telfer, track and field
 Lia Thomas, swimming
 Andraya Yearwood, track and field (high school)

Non-binary athletes 
 Laura Goodkind, Paralympic rowing
 Timothy LeDuc, figure skating
 Robyn Lambird, wheelchair racing
 Quinn, soccer
 Alana Smith, skateboarding
 Maria "Maz" Strong, Paralympic seated shot put

See also
 Gay Games
 List of LGBT sportspeople

References

Further reading
 NCAA Inclusion of Transgender Student-Athletes 
 Including Transgender Athletes in Sex-Segregated Sport
 Transgender student-athletes and sex-segregated sport: Developing policies of inclusion for intercollegiate and interscholastic athletics
 Hormone Check: Critique of Olympic Rules on Sex and Gender